The 2021 GT Cup Championship is the 15th GT Cup Championship, a British sports car championship. The season began on 10 April at Donington Park and end on 3 October at Snetterton Circuit, after twenty-six races held over seven meetings.

Calendar
The calendar was announced on 14 October 2020. The championship will support the 2021 GT World Challenge Europe Sprint Cup at Brands Hatch. The Brands Hatch round has been postponed and will be rescheduled. It was later announced that the Brands Hatch event would be held over the course of 1 May, with only 2 50-minute races taking place.

Teams and drivers
Classes:
Group GTO: Open specification (GT2, GTE, modified) cars
Group GT3: Homologated GT3 cars
Group GTA: Lower spec, challenge cars
Group GTB: Early year challenge and cup cars
Group GTC: Later year challenge and cup cars
Group GTH: Homologated GT4 cars

Results
Bold indicates overall winner.

Overall championship standings

Points are awarded as follows:

Class championship standings

Points are awarded as follows:

Notes

References

External links

Sports car racing series
GT Cup Championship
GT Cup Championship